Cheshmeh Bid (also Romanized as Cheshmeh Bīd; also known as Cheshmeh Bīd Rīmaleh) is a village in Honam Rural District, in the Central District of Selseleh County, Lorestan Province, Iran. At the 2006 census, its population was 151, in 28 families.

References 

Towns and villages in Selseleh County